Gammaridae is a  family of amphipods. In North America they are included among the folk taxonomic category of "scuds", and otherwise gammarids is usually used as a common name.

They have a wide distribution, centered on Eurasia, and are euryhaline as a lineage, inhabiting fresh to marine waters.

Systematics
The Gammaridae were for a long time used as a "wastebin taxon", which included numerous genera of gammaridean amphipods that since then have been removed to their own families, such as the Anisogammaridae, Melitidae, Niphargidae.

The following genera are currently listed in the family:

Akerogammarus Derzhavin & Pjatakova, 1967
Albanogammarus Ruffo, 1995
Amathillina G. O. Sars, 1894
Axelboeckia Stebbing, 1899
Baku Karaman & Barnard, 1979
Cephalogammarus Karaman & Barnard, 1979
Chaetogammarus Martynov, 1924
Comatogammarus Stock, 1981
Condiciogammarus G. Karaman, 1984
Dershavinella Birstein, 1938
Dikerogammarus Stebbing, 1899
Echinogammarus Stebbing, 1899
Gammarus Fabricius, 1775
Gmelina G. O. Sars, 1894
Gmelinopsis G. O. Sars, 1896
Homoeogammarus Schellenberg, 1937
Ilvanella Vigna-Taglianti, 1971
Jubeogammarus G. Karaman, 1984
Jugogammarus S. Karaman, 1953
Kuzmelina Karaman & Barnard, 1979
Lanceogammarus Karaman & Barnard, 1979
Laurogammarus G. Karaman, 1984
Longigammarus G.S. Karaman, 1970
Lunulogammarus Krapp-Schickel, Ruffo & Schiecke, 1994
Lusigammarus Barnard & Barnard, 1983
Marinogammarus Sexton & Spooner, 1940
Neogammarus Ruffo, 1937
Parhomoeogammarus Schellenberg, 1943
Pectenogammarus Reid, 1940
Relictogammarus Hou & Sket, 2016
Rhipidogammarus Stock, 1971
Sarothrogammarus Martynov, 1935
Scytaelina Stock, Mirzajani, Vonk, Naderi & Kiabi, 1998
Shablogammarus Carausu, Dobreanu & Manolache, 1955
Sinogammarus Karaman & Ruffo, 1994
Sowinskya Derzhavin, 1948
Tadzhikistania Barnard & Barnard, 1983
Tadzocrangonyx Karaman & Barnard, 1979
Trichogammarus Hou & Sket, 2016
Tyrrhenogammarus Karaman & Ruffo, 1989
Yogmelina Karaman & Barnard, 1979

References

External links

 Scuds in the Aquarium 
 Scuds In Aquarium (What are they and should I remove them) 

 
Crustacean families